"Junketsu Paradox" is the 25th single by Japanese singer and voice actress Nana Mizuki, released on August 3, 2011 by King Records.

Track listing 
 "Junketsu Paradox"
Lyrics: Nana Mizuki
Composition: Eriko Yoshiki
Arrangement: Jun Suyama
Ending theme for anime television series Blood-C
 "7Colors"
Lyrics, composition: Yoshihiro Saito
Arrangement: Takahiro Furukawa
Ending theme for TBS TV program Sekai Fushigi Hakken!
 "Stay Gold"
Lyrics, composition: Koutapai
Arrangement: Junpei Fujita (Elements Garden)
Ending theme for

Charts
Oricon Sales Chart (Japan)

References

2011 singles
Nana Mizuki songs
Songs written by Nana Mizuki